Repalle railway station (station code:RAL), is a D-category Indian Railways station in Guntur railway division of South Central Railway zone. It is situated on the Tenali–Repalle branch line and provides rail connectivity to the town of Repalle. It is one of the stations in the division to be equipped with Automatic Ticket Vending Machines (ATVM's).

History 
Repalle railway station started its operations in the year 1916, due to the opening of Guntur–Repalle broad-gauge section via Tenali. It was under the then, Madras and Southern Mahratta Railway. Present this station operates trains to Tenali and Secunderabad stations  In 2012–13, a survey report was submitted for new –Repalle railway line. The most trains from Repalle are via Tenali Junction railway station because it was a commercial stop here.

Structure and amenities 
The station has roof top solar panels installed by the Indian railways, along with various railway stations and service buildings in the country, as a part of sourcing 500 MW solar energy.

Originating express trains

See also 
 List of railway stations in India

References 

Railway stations on Tenali-Repalle line
Railway stations in Guntur district
Railway stations opened in 1916
Railway stations in Guntur railway division
1916 establishments in India